James Ramm (born 30 April 1998 in Australia) is an Australian rugby union player who plays for Northampton Saints in Premiership Rugby. His playing position is wing. 

He was signed to the Waratahs squad for the 2020 season.

He signed for Northampton Saints ahead of the 2022/23 season. Ramm made his debut in the Premiership Rugby Cup, scoring two tries in a 26-28 loss to London Irish.

Reference list

External links
Rugby.com.au profile
itsrugby.co.uk profile

1998 births
Australian rugby union players
Living people
Rugby union wings
New South Wales Waratahs players
Sydney (NRC team) players
Northampton Saints players